Robert "Sonny" Carson (also known as Mwlina Imiri Abubadika; May 22, 1936 – December 20, 2002), was a U.S. Army Korean War veteran, racial civil rights activist, and community leader in Brooklyn, New York. Carson was known for political organizing and coordinating public protests of the school systems in African-American communities in New York during the 1960s and 70s. He wrote a popular autobiography, The Education of Sonny Carson (1972), which was made into a 1974 film. Carson is the father of hip-hop artist Professor X.

Biography
Robert Carson Jr. was born on May 22, 1936 in Orangeburg, South Carolina, but moved to Brooklyn as a child. In his youth, Carson joined a street gang called the Bishops. Carson was arrested after robbing a Western Union messenger and was sent to a juvenile-detention center.

Carson fought in the Korean War with the 82nd Airborne Division, where he claimed to have met a Korean soldier who asked him, "Why would a black man fight for a country that would not let you drink from the same water fountain in Mississippi?" This pivotal question led Carson to become a community activist after returning to civilian life.

Following his return to civilian life, Carson enrolled in college, and for a period of time he returned to involvement in illegal activities. However, he soon began working for the Congress of Racial Equality (CORE), and by 1967 he was the executive director of the Brooklyn CORE. He broke from the organization in 1968, stating that it had not done enough to help African-Americans.

Carson's later founded a group called the Committee to Honor Black Heroes.

Kidnapping conviction
In 1974, Carson was convicted of kidnapping. The kidnapping charges, as the New York Times explained, "stemmed from what the defense represented as an attempted citizen's arrest of two other men who had twice robbed a black‐owned hotel in Brooklyn's Bedford‐Stuyvesant section." Carson was incarcerated for 15 months in the Sing Sing prison.

Advocate against drug use
In the 1980s Carson became an advocate against drug use, founding a group called "Black Men's Movement Against Crack".

Protesting police brutality
In the 1980s, Carson organized a number of demonstrations protesting police brutality.

Controversies
Carson organized the controversial Family Red Apple boycott of Korean-American owned stores in the Flatbush section of Brooklyn in 1990.  He was also involved in the 1991 Crown Heights riot.

Family Red Apple boycott
Carson took a central role in organizing the Family Red Apple boycott, also known as the Flatbush boycott. Carson was investigated by the FBI, under the suspicion that he violated the civil rights of the Korean shopkeepers.

Accusations of antisemitism
Carson was charged by his critics for being antisemitic. Carson responded, "That's absolutely absurd, 'antisemitic.' And so that you don't ask the question, I'm antiwhite. Don't limit my antis to just one group of people." Carson was known for leading groups of activists into schools to tell Jewish teachers that, “The Germans did not do a good enough job with the Jews.”
In his autobiography, The Education of Sonny Carson, however, Carson described successfully working side by side with Americans of Caucasian and Jewish descent during his time in the U.S. Army, the 1960s Civil Rights Movement and the Brooklyn chapter of CORE.

Protest philosophy
Carson's political tactics often involved the use of public protest. His protest philosophy considered disrupting social order to draw attention to the plight of African-Americans. Several of Carson's protests turned violent. In an interview with The New York Times in 1987, Carson said: "You don't give us any justice, then there ain't going to be no peace. We're going to use whatever means necessary to make sure that everyone is disrupted in their normal life."

The Dinkins campaign
Carson was the subject of media scrutiny in 1989, following speculations that the Dinkins mayoral campaign provided payments to Carson. The purpose of the payments was claimed to be either for a "get out of vote" drive organized by Carson, or, as critics maintained, for the assurance that Carson would refrain from staging protests during the campaign. Carson denied keeping campaign funds.

David Dinkins released a statement apologizing for involving Carson in his campaign. Following one of Carson's "Anti-White" statements, Dinkins released a public statement critical of Carson stating: "Sonny Carson's comment represents the kind of bigotry and intolerance I utterly reject and have fought against my whole life. Had such comments come to my attention, he never would have played a role in my campaign."

Death 
A few months before December 2002, Carson suffered two heart attacks and became comatose. He was admitted to the Manhattan Veterans Affairs Medical Center, where he remained until his death on December 20, 2002, at the age of 66.

References

1936 births
2002 deaths
African and Black nationalists
United States Army personnel of the Korean War
Activists from New York (state)
People from Brooklyn
African-American activists
21st-century African-American people